James Gleick (born August 1, 1954) is an American author and historian of science whose work has chronicled the cultural impact of modern technology. Recognized for his writing about complex subjects through the techniques of narrative nonfiction, he has been called "one of the great science writers of all time". He is part of the inspiration for Jurassic Park character Ian Malcolm.

Gleick's books include the international bestsellers Chaos: Making a New Science (1987) and The Information: A History, a Theory, a Flood (2011). Three of his books have been Pulitzer Prize and National Book Award finalists; and The Information was awarded the PEN/E. O. Wilson Literary Science Writing Award in 2012 and the Royal Society Winton Prize for Science Books 2012. His books have been translated into more than thirty languages.

Biography
A native of New York City, Gleick attended Harvard College, where he was an editor of The Harvard Crimson, graduating in 1976 with an A.B. degree in English and linguistics. He moved to Minneapolis and helped found an alternative weekly newspaper, Metropolis. After its demise a year later, he returned to New York and in 1979 joined the staff of The New York Times. He worked there for ten years as an editor on the metropolitan desk and then as a science reporter.
Among the scientists Gleick profiled in the New York Times Magazine were Douglas Hofstadter, Stephen Jay Gould, Mitchell Feigenbaum, and Benoit Mandelbrot. His early reporting on Microsoft anticipated the antitrust investigations by the U. S. Department of Justice and the European Commission. He wrote the "Fast Forward" column in the New York Times Magazine from 1995 to 1999, and his essays charting the growth of the Internet formed the basis of his book What Just Happened. His work has also appeared in The New Yorker, the Atlantic, Slate, and The Washington Post, and he is a regular contributor to The New York Review of Books.

His first book, Chaos: Making a New Science, reported the development of the new science of chaos and complexity. It made the Butterfly Effect a household term, introduced the Mandelbrot Set and fractal geometry to a broad audience, and sparked popular interest in the subject, influencing such diverse writers as Tom Stoppard (Arcadia) and Michael Crichton (Jurassic Park).

The Pipeline
As a reaction to poor user experience with procmail configuration at Panix, Gleick founded The Pipeline in 1993, one of the earliest Internet service providers in New York City. The Pipeline was the first ISP to offer a graphical user interface, incorporating e-mail, chat, Usenet, and the World Wide Web, through software for Windows and Mac operating systems. Gleick and business partner Uday Ivatury licensed the Pipeline software to other Internet service providers in the United States and overseas. Gleick sold The Pipeline in 1995 to PSINet, where it was later absorbed into MindSpring and then EarthLink.

Aircraft accident
On December 20, 1997, Gleick was attempting to land his Rutan Long-EZ experimental plane at Greenwood Lake Airport in West Milford, New Jersey, when a build-up of ice in the engine's carburetor caused the aircraft engine to lose power and the plane landed short of the runway into rising terrain. The impact killed Gleick's adopted eight-year-old son, Harry, and left Gleick seriously injured.

Work
Gleick's writing style has been described as a combination of "clear mind, magpie-styled research and explanatory verve." After the publication of Chaos, Gleick collaborated with the photographer Eliot Porter on Nature's Chaos and with developers at Autodesk on Chaos: The Software. He was the McGraw Distinguished Lecturer at Princeton University in 1989–90. He was the first editor of The Best American Science Writing series.

His next books included two biographies, Genius: The Life and Science of Richard Feynman, and Isaac Newton, which John Banville said would "surely stand as the definitive study for a very long time to come."

Gleick was elected president of the Authors Guild in 2017.

Bibliography

References

External links

James Gleick's website with selections of his work.
James Gleick, author page in The New York Review of Books.
A Miracle Made Lyrical, Christopher Lydon interview with James Gleick.
The Narrative Thread, James Gleick talks with Robert Birnbaum on Identity Theory (webzine).
Leave Cyberspace, Meet in Egypt, article on the culture of Wikipedia.
Audio: James Gleick in conversation with Janna Levin at the Key West Literary Seminar, 2008.
'Science writer James Gleick explains the physics that define new media in the ongoing communications revolution' by Peter Kadzis, interview in the Boston Phoenix, April 6, 2011.
 
Time Travel.
Gleick on Twitter

1954 births
Living people
Harvard College alumni
American science writers
American biographers
American male biographers
American male journalists
American science journalists
American essayists
The New York Times columnists
The New York Times writers
People from Garrison, New York
Writers from New York City
American male essayists
The Harvard Crimson people
Survivors of aviation accidents or incidents